Yuri Filimonovich Ponosov (Tajik/Russian: Юрий Филимонович Поносов; born 1941) is a Tajikistani of Russian descent and formerly Soviet politician.

Early life and education 
Ponosov was born to a working-class family in the Russian Soviet Federative Socialist Republic in 1941. He graduated from a college in Chita in 1961 and later graduated from the Tashkent Institute of Railway Transport Engineers in the Uzbek SSR in 1974.

Career 
From 1961 to 1962, Ponosov worked as a machine operator of a construction department in the Tajik SSR. He then became a mechanic of a house building plant in the Ordzhonikidzeabad District in the Tajik SSR. He served in the Soviet Ground Forces from 1963 to 1966.  In 1966, he became the chief technologist of the same house building plant and was promoted to Deputy Director of the plant in 1972.

He joined the Communist Party of the Soviet Union in 1967. From 1973 to 1975, Ponosov served as the Deputy Chairman of the Ordzhonikidzeabad District Executive Committee. From 1975 to 1982, he served as the Second Secretary of the Ordzhonikidzeabad District Committee of the Communist Party of Tajikistan; the Tajik SSR branch of the Communist Party of the Soviet Union. He served as the Head of the Department of Organization and Party Work for the Kulob City Committee of the Communist Party of Tajikistan. From 1983 to 1985, he served as the First Secretary of the Kulob City Committee of the Communist Party of Tajikistan. He served as the Second Secretary of the Gorno-Badakhshan Regional Committee of the Communist Party of Tajikistan from 1985 to 1988. He served as the First Deputy Chairman of the Dushanbe City Executive Committee from 1988 to 1990. He was also appointed to the post of Minister of Construction of the Tajik SSR in 1990. He retained his post of Minister of Construction after the dissolution of the Soviet Union although the ministry was dissolved by the Supreme Soviet of the Tajik SSR in 1992. Ponosov was the third mayor of Dushanbe and served from 1994 to 1996. He assumed the position of First Deputy Prime Minister of Tajikistan on March 28, 1996, but was relieved on February 18, 1998 and left for Moscow. He served as the Head of the Department of Rosstroy of Russia from 1998 to 2001.

Personal life 
Ponosov has been living in Russia since 1998.

Awards 
  Order of the Badge of Honour

See also 
 Politics of Tajikistan
 Politics of the Soviet Union

References 

Living people
1941 births
Mayors of Dushanbe
Tajikistani people of Russian descent